This is a list of administrators and Governors of Adamawa State, Nigeria, which was formed on 1991-08-27 when Gongola State was divided into Adamawa and Taraba states.

See also
Nigeria
States of Nigeria
List of state governors of Nigeria

References

Adamawa